Neo-Calvinism, a form of Dutch Calvinism, is a theological movement initiated by the theologian and former Dutch prime minister Abraham Kuyper. James Bratt has identified a number of different types of Dutch Calvinism: The Seceders, split into the Reformed Church "West" and the Confessionalists; the neo-Calvinists; and the Positives and the Antithetical Calvinists. The Seceders were largely infralapsarian and the neo-Calvinists usually supralapsarian.

Kuyper wanted to awaken the church from what he viewed as its pietistic slumber. He declared:

This refrain has become something of a rallying call for neo-Calvinists.

Emphases of neo-Calvinism 

Source:
Jesus is Lord over all of creation. Jesus’ Lordship extends through every area and aspect of lifeit is not restricted to the sphere of church or of personal piety. 
The idea that all of life is to be redeemed. The work of Jesus on the cross extends over all of lifeno area is exempt from its impact. All knowledge is affected by the true knowledge of God through redemption in Christ.
Cultural Mandate. Genesis 1:26–28 has been described as a cultural mandate. It is the mandate to cultivate and develop the creation.  There is a historical development and cultural unfolding. Some neo-Calvinists hold that the Cultural Mandate is as important as the Great Commission.
Creation, fall and redemption. God's good creation has been disrupted by the fall. Redemption is a restoration of creation.
Sphere sovereignty (Soevereiniteit in eigen kring). Each sphere (or sector) of life has its own distinct responsibilities and authority as designed by Godfor instance, communities dedicated to worship, civil justice, agriculture, family, etc.and no one area of life is sovereign over another. Hence, neither faith-institutions nor an institution of civil justice (that is, the state) should seek totalitarian control or any regulation of human activity outside their limited competence.
A rejection of dualism. Dualisms are (purportedly false) bifurcations, dichotomies, contrasts, or oppositions, such as the dualism between nature and grace that [allegedly] dominated much of Scholasticism. In the neo-Calvinist view, nature is the God-created and sustained cosmic order, not a "non-supernatural" category, and grace is God's means of renewing the cosmic order, it is not something "non-creational" added onto nature (albeit eschatological in consummated glorification of bodily resurrection to eternal life and cosmic transformation of the new heavens and earth).
Structure and direction. Structure denotes created laws and norms for (other) created things. Direction denotes relative deviation or conformity to norms; primarily regarding the central orientation of the human heart toward or away from God in Christ.
Common grace. God providentially sustains the created order, restraining of possible evils and giving non-salvific good gifts to all humanity despite their fall into sin, God's curse, and his eventual condemnation of the unredeemed.
Presuppositional apologetics. The only framework in which any fact about the world is intelligible is the Christian worldview in general, and the theologically Reformed worldview in particular.  The principles of logic and the use of reason assume the existence of God. Presuppositionalism is a reductio ad absurdum approach to Christian apologetics, in that it argues that all non-Christian worldviews are internally inconsistent.
The antithesis. There is a struggle in history and within every personbetween submission to and rebellion against God; between the kingdom of light and the kingdom of darkness; between the age to come (already inaugurated in Christ) and this present evil age (of sin).
World views. Neo-Calvinists reject the notion that theoretical thought can be religiously neutral. All thinking and practice is shaped by world views and religious ground motives. For the neo-Calvinist, life in all its aspects can be shaped by a distinctively Christian world view.
The role of law. For neo-Calvinists, "Law" is more than the Mosaic Decalogue, or even the entire abiding moral will of God. Law is, rather, the order for creation (or creation ordinances) established by God and includes a variety of types of cultural norms including physiological, psychological, logical, historical, linguistic, social, economic, aesthetic, juridical, and faith norms.

Key individuals associated with neo-Calvinism 
Guillaume Groen van Prinsterer
Abraham Kuyper
Herman Bavinck
Klaas Schilder
Herman Dooyeweerd
D. H. Th. Vollenhoven
Gerrit Cornelis Berkouwer
Albert Wolters
Craig Bartholomew
Nicholas Wolterstorff
James K.A. Smith
Richard Mouw
George Marsden
Cornelius Plantinga
E. L. Hebden Taylor
H. Evan Runner
Hans Rookmaaker
Auguste Lecerf
Chuck Colson
Stephanus Jacobus du Toit

Neo-Calvinist institutions and organizations 
Arrowhead Christian Academy in Redlands, California
Calvin University, Grand Rapids, MI
The Center for Public Justice
Dordt University, Sioux Center, IA, USA.
Free University in Amsterdam, The Netherlands
Theological University of the Reformed Churches in Kampen, the Netherlands
Institute for Christian Studies, Toronto, Canada
Kuyper College
Geneva College, Beaver Falls, PA
Covenant College, Lookout Mtn, GA
Redeemer University College, Ancaster, ON, Canada
Trinity Christian College, Palos Heights, IL

Key texts 
 .
 .
 .
 Sutanto Brock, N. Gray and Cory C., Neo-Calvinism: A Theological Introduction.
 Plantinga, Cornelius, Engaging God's World: A Christian Vision of Faith, Learning, and Living.
 Goheen, Michael W., and Bartholomew, Craig, Living at the Crossroads: An Introduction to Christian Worldview.

References

Footnotes

Bibliography

Further reading

External links

 .
 .
 .
 . 
 .
 .
  – a Neocalvinist commentary.
  – Neo-Calvinist resources.
 .
 . by Mike Wagenman

Calvinist theology